Holophaea erharda is a moth of the subfamily Arctiinae. It was described by Schaus in 1927. It is found in Brazil.

References

 Natural History Museum Lepidoptera generic names catalog

Euchromiina
Moths described in 1927